James Stephenson (born ) is an English rugby union player for Worcester Warriors. He previously played for Bedford Blues and Blackheath.

He plays as a wing or centre.

In April 2013, Stephenson signed a three-year contract with Worcester.

External links
Worcester Warriors profile

References 

1990 births
Living people
Worcester Warriors players
English rugby union players
Rugby union wings
Rugby union centres
Bedford Blues players
Blackheath F.C. players